Exosome complex exonuclease RRP44 or Dis3 is an enzyme that in humans is encoded by the DIS3 gene. Its protein product is an RNase enzyme homologous to the yeast protein Rrp44, and can be part of the exosome complex in the nucleus of eukaryotic cells.

References

Further reading